The 2000 Tour de Pologne was the 57th edition of the Tour de Pologne cycle race and was held from 4 September to 10 September 2000. The race started in Braniewo and finished in Karpacz. The race was won by Piotr Przydział.

General classification

References

2000
Tour de Pologne
September 2000 sports events in Europe